The 2008 Giro della Toscana Int. Femminile – Memorial Michela Fanini was the 15th edition of the Giro della Toscana Int. Femminile – Memorial Michela Fanini, a women's cycling stage race in Italy. It was rated by the UCI as a category 2.1 race and was held between 16 and 21 September 2008.

Stages

Stage 1
12 September 2008 – Viareggio to Viareggio, Team time trial

Stage 2a
17 September 2008 – Porcari to Montecarlo,

Stage 2b
17 September 2008 – Pontedera to Altopascio,

Stage 3
18 September 2008 – Lari to Volterra,

Stage 4
19 September 2008 – Campi Bisenzio to Campi Bisenzio,

Stage 5
20 September 2008 – Segromigno in Piano to Capannori,

Stage 6
21 September 2008 – Quarrata to Firenze,

Final classification

Source

See also
 2008 in women's road cycling

References

External links
 

2008 in women's road cycling
Giro della Toscana Int. Femminile – Memorial Michela Fanini
2008 in Italian sport